"On My First Sonne", a poem by Ben Jonson, was written in 1603 and published in 1616 after the death of Jonson's first son Benjamin at the age of seven. The poem, a reflection of a father's pain in his young son's death, is rendered more acutely moving when compared with Jonson's other, usually more cynical or mocking, poetry. It is clearly different from the poem written about his daughter's death, which does not show the loss on such an intense level.

References

English poems
1603 poems